The 29th Ryder Cup Matches were held September 27–29, 1991, on The Ocean Course at Kiawah Island Golf Resort in Kiawah Island, South Carolina, southwest of Charleston.

The United States team won the competition by 14 to 13 points, winning back the Cup on the 18th hole of the final match. Bernhard Langer missed a six-foot (1.8 m) par putt which would have won his match and clinched a 14-all tie and retained the Ryder Cup for Europe. It was the first win for the U.S. since 1983, after consecutive losses to Europe in 1985 and 1987 and a tie in 1989. Due to the fierce competition, gamesmanship and general over-exuberance of the U.S. Team and their fans, these Ryder Cup Matches became known as the "War on the Shore."

The Ocean Course later hosted the PGA Championship in 2012 and 2021.

Format
The Ryder Cup is a match play event, with each match worth one point.  The competition format in 1991 was as follows:
Day 1 (Friday) — 4 foursome (alternate shot) matches in a morning session and 4 four-ball (better ball) matches in an afternoon session
Day 2 (Saturday) — 4 foursome matches in a morning session and 4 four-ball matches in an afternoon session
Day 3 (Sunday) — 12 singles matches
With a total of 28 points, 14 points were required to win the Cup, and 14 points were required for the defending champion to retain the Cup.  All matches were played to a maximum of 18 holes.

Teams

Captains picks are shown in yellow. The world rankings and records are at the start of the 1991 Ryder Cup.

The selection process for the European team remained the same as used since 1985, with nine players chosen from the 1991 European Tour money list at the conclusion of the German Open on August 25 and the remaining three team members being chosen immediately afterwards by the team captain, Bernard Gallacher. Gallacher had announced before the final event that he would choose Nick Faldo as one of his picks. He also announced that he would select José María Olazábal, who was then in the 9th and final automatic spot, even if he dropped out of the top nine. At the time Olazábal and Faldo were second and third in the world rankings. Olazábal had just won The International on the PGA Tour. Eamonn Darcy, in 7th place in the points list, chose to miss the German Open. However, with David Gilford earning £4,320 in prize money, Sam Torrance tying for 3rd place and Paul Broadhurst losing a playoff, Darcy dropped to 10th place in the final list, £58.26 behind Gilford. Olazábal dropped to 11th place in the points list but had been assured of selection anyway. Gallacher chose Mark James as his third choice in preference to Darcy.

Captains picks are shown in yellow. The world rankings and records are at the start of the 1991 Ryder Cup.

Friday's matches

Morning foursomes

Afternoon four-ball

Saturday's matches

Morning foursomes

Afternoon four-ball

Sunday's singles matches

Individual player records
Each entry refers to the win–loss–half record of the player.

Source:

United States

Europe

Steve Pate injury controversy
On the eve of the games, Steve Pate and some other members of the U.S. team were involved in a minor caravan crash causing Pate to bruise his ribs and need hospital treatment. Much was discussed by the U.S. captain to either replace him at the last minute or carry on as planned. The decision was taken to allow Pate to participate in the games causing him to sit out the first three sessions of play. The only session he played in was a four-ball on Saturday afternoon, losing to Bernhard Langer and Colin Montgomerie. Prior to the first singles tee off on Sunday the U.S. team announced that Steve Pate was unable to play in the singles due to his earlier sustained injury. As a result, the match he was due to contend with David Gilford was automatically halved causing Gilford to miss out his singles match.

This brought heavy criticism from the general media and the European team feeling a sense of bad sportsmanship on behalf of the Americans. Especially considering U.S. captain Dave Stockton had chosen to play Pate in an earlier match thus risking causing further unnecessary injury to the player. In post-match interviews serious questions were asked of the American's reasoning and tactics behind claiming half a point for one of their weaker players.

Ballesteros/Azinger and Floyd controversies
Ballesteros and Azinger had previously locked horns in 1989 when Ballesteros tried to have a scuffed ball taken out of play which Azinger disagreed with.

The bad blood escalated at Kiawah Island when on the morning of the Friday foursomes with Ballesteros partnering José María Olazábal against Paul Azinger and Chip Beck the Europeans noticed the Americans had changed the compression of the ball on the 7th tee which is in violation of the one-ball rule. Ballesteros accused his opponents of doing this at least three times since the start of the match. On speaking with the referee at first Azinger flatly denied it. However once it had become apparent to the Americans that they were not called up on the violation at the time of incident therefore could no longer be penalized by loss of hole they admitted to switching their ball. This incident was the stem of accusations of the U.S. side of repeated gamesmanship, bad sportsmanship and ill tactics in many future matches to come.

On the morning of the Saturday foursomes with Ballesteros partnering José María Olazábal against Raymond Floyd and Fred Couples, Ballesteros developed a small cough. After noise was coincidentally made during swings made by the United States Team on the first 2 holes, Floyd approached Ballesteros with a severe warning that he was "better than you (Ballesteros) could ever be at this" and that if Ballesteros did not stop he would reciprocate with force. 

Since the mid-1980s, the European team had dominated the event including wins in 1985, 1987 and retaining the cup in 1989. With exception to 1993, the European team continued to dominate until ill feelings between the two sides came to a head in an explosive match at Brookline in 1999 where the U.S. side and their fans were again accused of having the mindset of "anything to win" going against the spirit of how the matches were intended to be played.

References

External links
PGA of America: 1991 Ryder Cup
About.com: 1991 Ryder Cup
1991 Ryder Cup Article Blood, Sweat And Tears
 Kiawah Island Golf Resort

Ryder Cup
Golf in South Carolina
Ryder Cup
Ryder Cup
Ryder Cup
Ryder Cup